Trinity Mills station is a train station in Carrollton, Texas. It serves DART Light Rail's  as well as Denton County's A-train commuter rail line serving as its southern terminus.

The station opened as part of the Green Line's expansion in December 2010, replacing the nearby North Carrollton Transit Center. (The latter is fully closed including the station house.) A-Train service began June 20, 2011.

References

External links
Dallas Area Rapid Transit - Trinity Mills Station
City of Carrollton Transit Oriented Development

A-train (Denton County Transportation Authority) stations
Dallas Area Rapid Transit light rail stations
Railway stations in the United States opened in 2010
Railway stations in Dallas County, Texas